Acroclita posterovenata is a moth of the family Tortricidae. It is found in Vietnam.

The wingspan is 18 mm. The ground colour of the forewings is brown cream, slightly mixed with grey dorsally. The suffusions, parts of some veins and longitudinal lines are brownish and the costal strigulae (fine streaks) are dirty cream. The hindwings are pale brownish and transparent, with suffused brown veins.

Etymology
The name refers to the dark, distinct venation of the posterior wings.

References

Moths described in 2009
Eucosmini
Moths of Asia
Taxa named by Józef Razowski